The 1908 Illinois gubernatorial election was held on November 3, 1908. It saw the election of Republican nominee John G. Oglesby.

Primary elections
Primary elections were held on August 8, 1908.

Democratic primary

Candidates
John S. Cuneo
Elmer A. Perry, Democratic candidate for Lieutenant Governor in 1900

Results

Republican primary

Candidates
Samuel J. Drew, former State Representative
Thomas D. Knight
John G. Oglesby, State Representative
George Shumway
Frank L. Smith

Results

Prohibition primary

Candidates
William A. Brubaker, candidate for Mayor of Chicago in 1907
Jacob H. Hoofstetler

Results

Socialist primary

Candidates
John Collins, candidate for Governor in 1904

Results

General election

Candidates
C. E. Beach, Independence League
William A. Brubaker, Prohibition
John Collins, Socialist
Joseph Kohler, Socialist Labor
John G. Oglesby, Republican 
Elmer A. Perry, Democratic

Results

See also
1908 Illinois gubernatorial election

References

Bibliography

1908
lieutenant gubernatorial
Illinois
November 1908 events